Holland Lake sits at the base of the Swan Range  north of Seeley Lake in Missoula County, Montana. The area is part of Flathead National Forest and offers camping, hiking, swimming, and boating.

References

External links
Holland Lake Bathymetric Map Montana Fish, Wildlife & Parks 

Bodies of water of Missoula County, Montana
Lakes of Montana
Flathead National Forest